Love Remembers is the 28th album by George Benson, released June 8, 1993. This album charted at No. 1 on Billboard's Contemporary Jazz Albums chart, as well as No. 7 on its Jazz Albums chart.

Critical reception

Thom Jurek of AllMusic concludes his review with, "Love Remembers is certainly a solid high mark for Benson in the '90s, and anyone interested in Benson's brand of pop will be delighted with it."

Track listing

Track information and credits adapted from the album's liner notes.

Personnel 
 George Benson – lead vocals (1, 2, 4, 6, 7, 10, 12), guitar (2-12), backing vocals (6)
 William Bryant – Fender Rhodes (1)
 David Gamson – keyboards (1), drum programming (1)
 Melvin Lee Davis – synthesizers (2)
 Gary Henry – keyboards (2, 6), drum programming (2, 6), sequencing (2, 6), arrangements (2, 6), string synthesizer (8)
 Bob James – acoustic piano (3, 7, 8)
 Richard Tee – electric piano (3, 7, 9)
 Max Risenhoover – programming (3, 7, 8, 9), drum programming (5), synth percussion (7)
 Joseph Joubert – keyboards (4), rhythm arrangements (4)
 David Whitham – acoustic piano (4)
 Ronnie Foster – keyboards (5, 11)
 Michael Colina – programming (5), bass (5)
 Steven Benson Hue – electric piano, (6), drum programming (6), sequencing (6)
 Michael Bearden – acoustic piano (9), arrangements (9)
 Jimmy George – synthesizers (10), arrangements (10)
 John F. Hammond – keyboards (10), arrangements (10)
 Randy Waldman – acoustic piano (10), strings (10), keyboards (11)
 Aaron Zigman – keyboards (12)
 Eric Hanson – programming (12)
 Wah Wah Watson – guitar (1)
 Jeff Mironov – rhythm guitar (5, 7, 8)
 Pat Kelley – rhythm guitar (10)
 Phil Upchurch – rhythm guitar (11)
 Michael Landau – guitar (12)
 Abraham Laboriel – bass (1)
 Freddie Washington – bass (3, 9)
 Nathan East – bass (4, 7, 11)
 Will Lee – bass (8)
 Larry Kimpel – bass (10)
 John Patitucci – bass (12)
 Leon "Ndugu" Chancler – drums (1)
 Omar Hakim – drums (3, 7, 8, 9)
 Harvey Mason – drums (4)
 John Robinson – drums (10)
 Steve Ferrone – drums (11)
 Bill Summers – percussion (1)
 Paulinho da Costa – percussion (5, 11)
 Leonard Gibbs – percussion (8, 9)
 Hubert Laws – flute (3, 9)
 Kirk Whalum – saxophone (3, 7, 9), tenor saxophone (8), arrangements (8)
 Roger Byam – saxophone (4)
 Randy Brecker – flugelhorn (3)
 Chuck Findley – trumpet (12)
 Claude Gaudette – string arrangements (4)
 Bruce Frazier – string conductor (4)
 Stewart Levine – arrangements (12)
 Brian McKnight – backing vocals (1)
 Angela Clemmons-Patrick – backing vocals (5)
 Dennis Collins – backing vocals (5)
 Sharon Jerry-Collins – backing vocals (5)
 Darryl Tookes – backing vocals (5)
 Gwen Guthrie – lead vocals (6)
 Sharon Bryant – backing vocals (7)
 Lisa Fischer – backing vocals (7)
 Hilary James – backing vocals (7)
 Jeanne Ricks – backing vocals (7)
 Vaneese Thomas – backing vocals (7)
 Olivia McClurkin – backing vocals (10)
 Alfie Silas – backing vocals (10)
 Rose Stone – backing vocals (10)
 Gerry Knight – backing vocals (12)

Production 
 David Gamson – producer (1), engineer (1)
 George Benson – producer (2, 4, 5, 6, 10, 11), executive producer 
 Gary Henry – producer (2, 6), mixing (2, 6)
 Bob James – producer (3, 7, 8, 9)
 Charlie Wallert – producer (4, 5, 11)
 Jimmy George – producer (10), engineer (10)
 Stewart Levine – producer (12)
 Leonard Richardson – executive producer 
 Stephen Stewart-Short – engineer (1)
 Gary Chester – mixing (1)
 Goh Hotoda – mixing (1)
 Kendal Stubbs – engineer (2, 6)
 Bob Rosa – mixing (2, 6)
 Todd Whitelock – engineer (3)
 Bill Schnee – mixing (3, 4, 5, 10), engineer (4, 5, 10, 11)
 Al Schmitt – engineer (7, 8, 9)
 Ray Bardani – remixing (7)
 Michael Colina – remixing (7)
 Elliot Scheiner – mixing (8, 9)
 Daren Klein – engineer (12), mixing (12)
 Bernie Grundman – mastering at Bernie Grundman Mastering (Hollywood, California)
 Laura Harding – music contractor
 Lee Holdridge – music contractor
 Roger Laroque – music contractor
 Joe Soldo – music contractor 
 Lyn Weiss – music contractor
 Robbie C. Benson – production assistant 
 Kathleen Fegan – production coordinator 
 Julie Larson – production coordinator 
 Marion Orr – production coordinator 
 Lu Snead-Crowe – production coordinator 
 Garrett White – production coordinator 
 Michon C. Stanco – package coordinator 
 Christine Cano – art direction, design 
 Just Loomis – photography 
 Ken Fritz – management 
 Pamela Byers – management

Charts

References

External links
Artist Official Site
Warner Brothers Records Official Site

1993 albums
George Benson albums
Albums produced by Stewart Levine
Albums produced by Bob James (musician)
Warner Records albums